Malpar is a village and a gram panchayat in Rewa district in the Indian state of Madhya Pradesh. It is about 3 kilometers from Teonthar.

Location
The village is located at a distance of 2.8 kilometers from the town of Teonthar. It has a distance of 80 kilometers from district headquarters in Rewa. The Holy city of Allahabad is about 60 kilometers from Malpar. The village is situated on the banks of Tamsa River.The village is surrounded by Mango garden (Including Desi, Hybrid), Jamun and various other fruits and vegetables.

Transportation
Malpar is connected to both Rewa and Allahabad via Road. One can travel to Rewa via Teonthar and to Allahabad via chakghat. The village is connected to Teonthar by Pradhan Mantri Gram Sadak Yojana.
Main modes of transportation are buses and taxis. Nearest railway stations are Shankargarh, Allahabad and Rewa. Nearest airport is Allahabad Airport.

Demographics
Malpar is a medium sized village with total 143 families residing.  The village has a population of 759 of which 350 are males while 409 are females as per 2011 Census of India. 12.65 % of total population of village is under 6 years of age. Average Sex Ratio of Malpar village is 1169 which is higher than Madhya Pradesh state average of 931.  Malpar village has  literacy rate of 79.19 % compared to 69.32 % of Madhya Pradesh. In Malpar Male literacy stands at 92.05 % while female literacy rate was 68.42 %.   Malpar village is administrated by Sarpanch (Head of Village) who is elected representative of the village.

Economy
Like all other villages of country, Agriculture is the main occupation of people of Malpar. Rice, wheat, pulses, mustard etc are major crops. Vegetables like potato, brinjal, peas and carrots are also grown.
Malpar has a diverse community of people of various castes including Brahmin, kurmi, kol, Kewat, kori and many more. As the village is situated near The Tamas River, fishing is also done by some people. Malpar is a beautiful village and it has five tolas(टोला) -
 Mishiran
 Kurmian
 Shukulan
 Kadwari 
 Atarasuiya (Kori and Kewatan).
The village has a small temple of Lord Hanuman and three government schools-
Primary School Malpar, मलपार
Education Guarantee Scheme (EGS) School Atarasuiya, अतरसुइया
Shaskiya Pathshala Atarasuiya

Nearby Places Of Interest
Triveni Sangam , Allahabad (61 km)
Bahuti Falls (31 km)
Deur Kothar (17 km)
Deotalab Shiv Mandir (54 km)
Adagad Nath Mandir (11 km)

References 

Villages in Rewa district